Joseph Ernest Roger Léger (March 26, 1919 – April 7, 1965) was a professional ice hockey player who played 187 games in the National Hockey League. He was born in L'Annonciation, Quebec. He played with the Montreal Canadiens and New York Rangers.

References 

1919 births
1965 deaths
Canadian ice hockey defencemen
Ice hockey people from Quebec
Montreal Canadiens players
New York Rangers players
New York Rovers players
People from Laurentides
Canadian expatriate ice hockey players in the United States